Paul McCartney in Red Square is a live DVD produced and directed by Mark Haefeli starring Paul McCartney, released in June 2005. It is composed of footage taken during his concerts in Moscow's Red Square and St Petersburg's Palace Square. Songs from Beatles, Wings and solo albums are performed. Each song is interspersed with interviews regarding the Beatles' banning in the Soviet Union in the 1960s, and how fans had to spend large sums of money on buying records from the black market. The film also supports the anti-Soviet opinion that The Beatles were an impetus behind a social revolution, which led to the fall of communism in Russia.

Both "Paul McCartney in Red Square" as well as "Paul McCartney in St. Petersburgh", earned Mark Haefeli Grammy nominations for 'Best Music, Variety and Comedy Special". Red Square also won The Mipcon for Best DVD of the year in 2007.

Songs – In Red Square
 "Getting Better"
 "Band on the Run"
 "Can't Buy Me Love"
 "Two of Us"
 "I Saw Her Standing There"
 "We Can Work It Out"
 "I've Just Seen A Face"
 "Live And Let Die"
 "Let 'Em In"
 "The Fool on the Hill"
 "Things We Said Today"
 "Birthday"
 "Maybe I'm Amazed"
 "Back in the U.S.S.R."
 "Calico Skies"
 "Hey Jude"
 "She's Leaving Home"
 "Yesterday"
 "Let It Be"
 "Back in the U.S.S.R. (Reprise)"

Personnel
Paul McCartney – lead vocals, bass guitar, guitars, piano
Brian Ray – rhythm guitar, bass guitar, backing vocals
Rusty Anderson – lead guitar, backing vocals
Abe Laboriel Jr. – drums, backing vocals
Wix Wickens – keyboards, backing vocals

Songs – St. Petersburg 
 Intro
 "Jet"
 "Got to Get You into My Life"
 "Flaming Pie"
 "Let Me Roll It"
 "Drive My Car"
 "Penny Lane"
 "Get Back"
 "Back in the U.S.S.R."
 "I've Got a Feeling"
 "Sgt. Pepper's"/"The End"
 "Helter Skelter"

Charts

Certifications

References

External links 
 

Paul McCartney video albums
Albums produced by David Kahne
2005 live albums
2005 video albums
Live video albums
Paul McCartney live albums